The Art of Dying is the fourth studio album by the American thrash metal band Death Angel, released on May 4, 2004. It was the band's first album with original material in 14 years since 1990's Act III. The album reached number 50 on the Billboard Top Independent Albums chart in 2004.

Death Angel guitarist Rob Cavestany once explained the origin of the album title as follows:  The Art of Dying sold around 2,100 copies in its first week in the U.S.

Track listing

Credits 
 Mark Osegueda – lead vocals
 Rob Cavestany – lead guitar, lead vocals on "Word to the Wise"
 Ted Aguilar – rhythm guitar
 Dennis Pepa – bass, lead vocals on "Land of Blood"
 Andy Galeon – drums, lead vocals on "Spirit"

References 

Death Angel albums
Nuclear Blast albums
2004 albums